Daniel M. Popper (August 17, 1913 – September 9, 1999) was an American astrophysicist.

Life and career
Popper was born in Oakland, California. He studied at the University of California, Berkeley where he received his Ph.D in 1938. He joined the University of California, Los Angeles in 1947, becoming a full professor in 1955. He worked at UCLA until his retirement in 1978. Popper died in 1999.

References

1913 births
1999 deaths
American astrophysicists
Scientists from California
People from Oakland, California
University of California, Berkeley alumni
University of California, Los Angeles faculty